Jean-Marie Benoît Balla (5 May 1959 – 31 May 2017) was a Cameroonian Catholic bishop who served as Archbishop of Yaoundé until his death in 2017.

Biography
Balla was born in Oweng, Cameroon, on 5 May 1959. He was ordained a priest for the Archdiocese of Yaoundé on 20 June 1987 and assigned to parish work. He then headed the minor seminary of Yaoundé and taught at the major seminary in Nkolbisson.

Pope John Paul II appointed him Bishop of Bafia on 3 May 2003 and he was consecrated a bishop on 12 July by Archbishop Jean Zoa of Yaoundé.

He was reported missing on the evening of 30 May 2017. When his car was located on a bridge over the Sanaga River on 31 May, it contained a note that said: "Do not look for me! I am in the water." There was no evidence of violence. On 2 June fishermen discovered his body seven kilometers from the bridge, and authorities estimated his death occurred on 31 May. An autopsy found signs of torture and that he had died days before his body was placed in the water only to be found after a few hours. Other murders of priests in Cameroon have gone unsolved, including that of the rector of the minor seminary of Bafia earlier in May.

Interpol commissioned a second autopsy by two German doctors who reported that "no trace of violence was found on the body of the deceased", after which the Central Appeal Court determined that “drowning is the most probable cause of death of the bishop". Some of Bala's relatives questioned whether the authorities had substituted a different body for the Interpol autopsy.

On 3 August 2017, Joseph Akonga Essomba, the interim administrator of the diocese, claimed Balla's murderers were being protected by government officials. He claimed that Balla attacked gay priests, who later pretended to mourn him, and that it was his opposition to homosexuality that had prompted his murder.

Catholics in Cameroon whose murders remained unsolved include Yves Plumey, Archbishop emeritus of Garoua (1991); the editor of the Catholic daily L'Effort camerounnais Joseph Mbassi (1988); Jesuit theologian Englebert Mveng, SJ (1995); and the French sisters Germaine Marie Husband and Marie Léone Bordy (1992).

Notes

1959 births
2017 deaths
21st-century Roman Catholic bishops in Cameroon
People murdered in Cameroon
Cameroonian murder victims
People from Centre Region (Cameroon)
Roman Catholic bishops of Bafia